Aasif Khan (born 13 March 1991) is an Indian actor, best known for his role as Babar in action crime thriller web television series Mirzapur (2018-2020).

Early life 
Aasif Khan was born and raised in Nimbahera, a small town in Chittorgarh district of Rajasthan, India. His father, Mr. Late Ayyub Khan was an employee in J.K. Cement, and his mother, Mrs. Firdous Ayyub Khan is a housewife. He has two brothers and a sister.

Khan was mediocre in academics but had a great inclination towards the field of arts. His keenness for acting began in 2001 at his school’s annual event, where he performed the role of a servant in Kissa Kursi Ka play. He was deeply inspired by the "shaadiwallah" act performed by comedian Raju Srivastava in the popular TV show The Great Indian Laughter Challenge. It encouraged him to participate in the stand-up competition held locally where he surprisingly won.

The sudden demise of his father in 2008 brought his acting ambition to a halt. He engaged himself in taking up small jobs for a living and parallelly completed his higher secondary education.

Career 
Khan moved to Mumbai in 2010 to revive his acting ambition. For sustenance, he initially worked in a hotel as a waiter. He later worked in a mall and simultaneously gave auditions, where he was advised to learn the art of acting and perform theatre. He appeared in Ready and Agneepath as a junior artist.

In 2011, he joined Sarthak and Ujaagar Theatre Group in Jaipur to learn theatre and sharpen his acting skills. He performed as a professional theatre artist, his first play being Abu Hassan directed by Rajiv Acharya, and several others for 5 years with prestigious groups and renowned personalities like Sabir Khan.

In 2015, he performed the Rajasthani play Kasumal Sapno, a musical adaptation of William Shakespeare’s comedy, A Midsummer Night’s Dream, directed by Ajeet Singh Palawat at the International Theatre Festival in Karachi organized by the Pakistan National Academy of Performing Arts (NAPA).

Aasif returned to Mumbai in 2016 and worked as a casting associate for a year in Casting Bay owned by his mentor cum friend Abhishek Banerjee and Anmol Ahuja. He made cameo appearances in Toilet: Ek Prem Katha and Pari.

He played the lead role as Durgesh Kumar – a young aspirant for an interview in Anurag Worlikar’s short film Vacancy (2017) for which he won the Best Actor award in Skylight Film Festival (2018) and Cineshorts by Viacom18.

In 2018, he played Babar, a loyal aide in web series Mirzapur.

Aasif made his Bollywood film debut in Raj Kumar Gupta’s India’s Most Wanted (2019) where he played a crucial role of Bittu Sinha alongside Arjun Kapoor. He appeared as Chintu in Humorously Yours (2019).

In 2020, Aasif overwhelmed the audience by his appearance in a crucial role of a journalist as Anas Ahmad in Jamtara – Sabka Number Ayega. He was next seen as a stubborn bridegroom in The Viral Fever’s comedy drama Panchayat (2020). He then appeared in Paatal Lok (2020) as Kabir M, a petty car thief who makes great efforts in dissembling his identity during an interrogation.

He continued to play Babar in Mirzapur season 2 and appeared in short film: Sorry (2020).

In 2021, Khan appeared in Click (2021), a short film streamed on Disney+ Hotstar and then appeared as Parchun in Umesh Bist’s comedy-drama film Pagglait which was released on 26 March 2021 on Netflix.

In 2022, Aasif appeared in the web series Human which was streamed on Disney+ Hotstar, in Dil Se Hero, a mini-series by FilterCopy, and in Murder In Agonda, an Amazon miniTV web series.

Aasif appeared as a lead protagonist in Ghar Set Hai, a comedy-drama web television series streamed on VOOT. He will be seen next in horror-comedy films Kakuda and The Virgin Tree, and in romantic comedy films viz. Ishq Chakkallas and Noorani Chehra.

Filmography

Films

Web series

Short films

Music video

As casting associate

Awards and nominations

References

External links 

 
 

1991 births
Male actors from Rajasthan
Living people
Male actors in Hindi cinema
People from Rajasthan
Indian male film actors
21st-century Indian male actors